The bowstripe barb (Enteromius viviparus) is a species of cyprinid fish in the genus Enteromius.  This species is native to Southern Africa.

The males become golden in colour while the females remain silver-brown. Both sexes have a dark stripe running longitudinally along the flanks.

The specific epithet viviparus ("viviparous") is in error; they lay eggs just like all other Enteromius. Fry have been noted in the lower reaches of slow flowing streams entering rivers, while adults have been noted amongst aquatic vegetation on river margins and in quiet pools in rapids.

References
 

Enteromius
Cyprinid fish of Africa
Fish described in 1897
Taxa named by Max Carl Wilhelm Weber